Go for Gold Philippines is a UCI Continental road cycling team based in the Philippines. It is managed as part of the Go for Gold project of the Powerball Marketing and Logistics Corp.

Go for Gold first registered with the UCI for the 2018 season. Its cycling jerseys are manufactured by Donen Sports.

Team roster

Major wins
2019
 Stage 1 PRUride Philippines, Ismael Grospe Jr.
 Stage 3 Tour de Singkarak, Ismael Grospe Jr.
 Stage 5 Tour de Singkarak, Jonel Carcueva
2020
 Stage 3 Cambodia Bay Cycling Tour, Ronnilan Quita

References

External links

Cycling teams established in 2017
UCI Continental Teams (Asia)
Cycling teams based in the Philippines
2017 establishments in the Philippines